Five Suspects is a 1950 West German crime film directed by Kurt Hoffmann and starring Hans Nielsen, Dorothea Wieck and Friedrich Schoenfelder. It is also known by the alternative title of City in the Fog.

The film's sets were designed by the art directors Franz Bi and Botho Hoefer. It was shot at the Spandau Studios in Berlin.

Cast
 Hans Nielsen as Kriminalrat Thomsen
 Dorothea Wieck as Frau Berling
 Friedrich Schoenfelder as Dr. Sven Berling
 Ina Halley as Ingrid Sörensen
 Blandine Ebinger as Margarite Lassens
 Josef Sieber as Schuldiener Palsberg / Erik Palsberg, dessen Bruder
 Franz Nicklisch as Karl Jensen
 Hans Leibelt as Schuldirektor Dr. Lassens
 Henry Lorenzen as Kriminalassistent Aalsen
 Lutz Moik as Klaus Eriksen
 Gunnar Möller as Ole Klimm
 Friedhelm von Petersson as Jacob Eriksen
 Horst Gentzen as Arne Hansen
 Thomas Lundberg as Knud Petersen
 Karl Klüsner as Oberlehrer Falster
 A. Koch as Arzt
 Jo Hanns Müller as Man
 Arno Paulsen as Vater Gustav Klimm
 Gustav Püttjer as Ohlsen
 Ottokar Runze as Schüler
 Werner Schott as Kriminalkommissar Ribe
 Kurt Waitzmann as Studienrat Dr. Claudius

References

Bibliography 
 Bergfelder, Tim. International Adventures: German Popular Cinema and European Co-Productions in the 1960s. Berghahn Books, 2005.

External links 
 

1950 films
West German films
German crime films
1950 crime films
1950s German-language films
Films directed by Kurt Hoffmann
Films based on German novels
Films set in Denmark
German black-and-white films
Films shot at Spandau Studios
1950s German films